The Germany women's national squash team represents Germany in international squash team competitions, and is governed by German Squash Association.

Since 1981, Germany has participated in two Semi finals of the World Squash Team Open.

Current team
 Sina Wall
 Sharon Sinclair
 Franziska Hennes
 Saskia Beinhard

Results

World Team Squash Championships

Note : Was West Germany until 1990

See also
 Deutscher Squash Verband
 World Team Squash Championships
 Germany men's national squash team

References

External links
 Team Germany

Squash teams
Women's national squash teams
Squash
Squash in Germany